Mr. Stain, also known as , is a digital computer (CGI) anime series created and directed by Ryuji Masuda. The producer of the show is Shunsuke Koga and the characters are designed by Wakako Masuda. The series involves surreal adventures centered on characters living in a junk-filled alley. The episodes are short, with a duration of about seven minutes, and start with Mr. Stain finding an object. The name of the episodes are the same as the items that Stain (or Palvan) finds. There is no dialogue, just music and sound effects. Each episode's ending credits show the characters who appeared along with their names in English, followed by a segment of everyone dancing and having fun.

The CGI was produced by Koga's CGI studio The Fool and premiered between 10:50 p.m. and 11:30 p.m. (JST) on December 31, 2002. It was broadcast in Japan by Kids Station, beginning January 6, 2003, on Monday, Tuesday and Wednesday at 12 p.m. (JST). It was also aired in Brazil and Latin america by Cartoon Network (L.A.), Funimation also included episodes of Mr. Stain on many of its other DVD releases. These short comedy bits were well received by DVD viewers and interest in the series grew. A DVD release of the show was also launched by Funimation for the US and Canada region.

Characters

Mr. Stain lives in a junk-filled alley and comes across objects in his searches. These objects seem ordinary at first but soon prove to be otherwise, resulting in awkward situations. He befriends a large feline, named Palvan, who almost always does not agree with Stain on the best use of a found item. Their arguments become extremely violent with one of them getting hurt, but things turn out well at the end. Both characters are very selfish but their tender side can also be seen. Mr. Stain is the only character who appears in all the episodes; Palvan is not in episodes four and ten. The rest of the characters appear occasionally in important roles, but can be seen in other episodes.

The characters in the series are an odd bunch with names that suggest their fate (or role) or their physique: Eaten is a fish that is consumed, Rings is a lizard that uses rings as an accessory around its neck, Pylon is a crab that uses a pylon as headgear, and Policeman is an officer of the law who comes to the alley on his rounds. Different minor characters, such as Squeezed dog and Masked monkey, appear in the series as inhabitants of "Junk Alley" besides Mr. Stain and Palvan. Others like Lost kitten and Stephanie, a young girl, accidentally enter the alley and are helped to find a way out. There is an abandoned baby and a pianist called Lifa, with whom Stain falls in love but must fight his alter-ego, Handsome Stain from the mirror world, for her affection.

Storyline

Mr. Stain is a street-dwelling vagabond who uncovers the mysterious and bizarre world of Junk Alley. Objects in the alley have magically come to life. Stain makes friends and along with them has adventures within the alley. The episodes usually start with him finding an odd object and an adventure ensues. The episodes are comic with some thought-provoking scenes.

One touching episode is Heavenly Bird, where Stain discovers a bird in a cage and wants to eat it. After a riotous chase through the alley while he tries to capture the animal, Stain realizes that the bird is sad and dying. It just wants to see its tropical homeland. Stain works through the night to build a cardboard model of the bird's homeland and when the Heavenly Bird sees it, he thinks he's home and dies. Another episode, titled Toy Robot, is about a remote controlled toy that decides that it no longer wants to be a servant, but wants to fly like the birds it sees. Stain, being helpful, comes up with different ways of making the robot fly, with comically tragic results. The last episode is an epilogue to the series and is for half an hour. The story revolves around Stain who sees a woman living in a high rise apartment and immediately falls in love with her. After a few comic attempts to get to her, all of which fail, he accidentally switches places with the attractive Handsome Stain from his mirror. This Stain has no problems getting to the woman and seducing her.

Episodes

DVD release

Contents
DVDs of Mr. Stain were originally released in Region 1 on March 26, 2006. They come in a standard amaray DVD case that contains a two-disc set and have a paper insert listing other Funimation releases. In addition to the fourteen episodes of Mr. Stain, the DVDs have nearly two hours of bonus material.

Music

Reception

Reviews

The CGI received a positive response from reviewers. John Sinnott of DVD talk compares it to the old Charlie Chaplin comedies, commenting that it is "very funny and filled with well thought out slapstick gags and odd situations". He adds,"This is a very fun and touching show and one of the better anime sets to be released so far this year. Otaku fans of well crafted comedy alike should give this series a look." He is impressed by the non use of dialogue, saying that the bitter sweet moments in the show "gives it heart." His opinion is more mixed on the fourteenth episode which, he feels, "did drag a bit."

Jeremy Mullin from IGN calls the show "weird", but adds that the weirdness makes the show appealing especially the "Looney Tunes"-like way in which it is done. He writes,"You usually get a good laugh at the antics of Mr. Stain and his friends, but sometimes things get dramatic in a thought-provoking way that gets to you. Some moments are particularly disturbing.". He acknowledges Mr. Stain to be "perfect for a nice break from reality when you want some laughs with the occasional moral message" and suggests that even non-anime fans could enjoy it.

Michael Bartholow, Advanced Media Networks(anime), calls the anime "wacky, bizarre and humorous with touching moments that are thought provoking". He too compares it to the Looney Tunes shows, specifically praising its choice to be visually oriented rather than relying on conventional dialogues. The reviewers conclude that the show can be watched by any viewer. They also credit it with "infectious" and "foot-tapping" music at the end and highly recommend its viewing.

Overall ratings

Advanced Media Network(Anime) 9.1 out of 10
IGN 7.0 out of 10.

Awards and international recognition

Received Excellent Animation Award in Cultural Affair Agencies'Media Art Festival.
Specially invited to the “Pusan International Film Festival” in Korea.
Officially invited to “Melbourne International Film Festival” in Australia (2004).

Notes and references

External links
 
Mr. Stain's Production House, 

2003 anime television series debuts
2003 Japanese television series endings
Funimation
Animated television series about cats
Surreal comedy anime and manga